Castle of Dreams is a 1919 British silent drama film directed by Wilfred Noy and starring Mary Odette, Fred Groves and Gertrude McCoy.

Cast
 Mary Odette as Lorelei Redfern 
 Fred Groves as John Morton  
 Gertrude McCoy as Irene Redfern  
 A. E. Matthews as Gerald Sumner  
 Henry Vibart as David Redfern  
 Mrs. Charles MacDona as Mrs. Trundle

References

Bibliography
 Bamford, Kenton. Distorted images: British national identity and film in the 1920s. I.B. Tauris, 1999.
 Low, Rachael. The History of the British Film 1918-1929. George Allen & Unwin, 1971.

External links
 

1919 films
1919 drama films
British drama films
British silent feature films
Films directed by Wilfred Noy
British black-and-white films
1910s English-language films
1910s British films
Silent drama films